Patrick A. Donahoe, S.J. was appointed Santa Clara University's 24th president after the presidency of Herman J. Hauck. A building is named in his honor.

References

Gerald McKevitt, S.J. The University of Santa Clara: A History, 1851-1977 (Page 385)
https://web.archive.org/web/20101221032157/http://scu.edu/president/history/past.cfm

1816 births
1897 deaths
20th-century American Jesuits
Presidents of Santa Clara University
19th-century American Roman Catholic priests